There are at least 22 named lakes and reservoirs in Jefferson County, Montana.

Lakes
 Cliff Lake, el. 
 Cottonwood Lake, el. 
 Forest Lake, el. 
 Frog Pond, el. 
 Glenwood Lake, el. 
 Hidden Lake, el. 
 Homestake Lake, el. 
 Ice Pond, el. 
 Leslie Lake, el. 
 Quartz Lake, el. 
 South Fork Lakes, el. 
 Tizer Lakes, el.

Reservoirs
 B and B Fishpond, el. 
 Columbia Gardens Water Supply, el. 
 Delmoe Lake, el. 
 Keogh Reservoir, el. 
 Maney Lake, el. 
 Northern Pacific Reservoir, el. 
 Northern Pacific Reservoir, el. 
 Park Lake, el. 
 Taylor Reservoir, el. 
 Whitetail Reservoir, el.

See also
 List of lakes in Montana

Notes

Bodies of water of Jefferson County, Montana
Jefferson